Nettetal is a municipality in the district of Viersen, North Rhine-Westphalia, Germany. It is situated in the Lower Rhine region.

History

Nettetal was founded on January 1, 1970, when the former townships Leuth, Breyell, Hinsbeck and former towns/cities Lobberich and Kaldenkirchen were merged. All five communities had developed around the river Nette.

Nettetal originally contained five boroughs, until Schaag separated from Breyell in 1995, becoming the sixth borough.

At the time of its formation, it was considered too problematic to try and combine all five coats of arms into one, so a new coat of arm was introduced in 1971. It shows a water lily before a blue blackground, symbolizing the predominance of nature and the variety of lakes. Five water lily leaves represent the five founding boroughs of Nettetal.

Demographics

Nettetal's six boroughs, with populations per its own census, as of December 2020:

Geography

In addition to the river Nette, peat mining from the 16th to the 19th century has resulted in the formation of twelve lakes in the municipality.

The Nette, broad forest, heath areas and lakes make Nettetal a central resort in the Maas-Schwalm-Nette Nature Park.

Lakes

Fed by the Nette:
 Kleiner Breyeller See (5.3 ha)
 Großer Breyeller See (9.2 ha)
 Nettebruch (13.2 ha)
 Windmühlenbruch (6 ha)
 Ferkensbruch (4.5 ha)
 Kleiner de Wittsee (4.5 ha)
 Großer de Wittsee (22.5 ha)
 Schrolik (15.5 ha)
 Poelvennsee (24.5 ha)

Fed by the Nette's Renne tributary:
 Hinsbecker Bruch (37.5 ha)
 Glabbacher Bruch (36 ha)

Fed by the Nette's Königsbach tributary:
 Kälberweide (5 ha)

Sights

 The 11th century Krickenbeck Castle and its park, set in the Leuth borough, surrounded by the Hinsbecker Bruch, Glabbacher Bruch, Schrolik and Poelvennsee lakes
 The Kaldenkirchen Sequoia Farm, in the Kaldenkirchen borough, an arboretum with Giant Sequoias and more than 400 other varieties of trees, part of the "Protected area of Maas-Schwalm-Nette"
 A portion of the  Fietsallee am Nordkanal, an international long-distance cycling route between Neuss, Germany, and Nederweert, Netherlands
 The  Galgenvenn hiking trail, voted "Germany's second most beautiful hiking trail" in 2016

Twin towns – sister cities

Nettetal is twinned with:
 Ełk, Poland
 Fenland, England, United Kingdom
 Rives-en-Seine, France

Notable people

 Leo Anton Karl de Ball (1853–1916), German-Austrian astronomer
 Werner Jaeger (1888–1961), classicist
 Michael Hardt (born 1951), designer
 Sascha Lappessen (born 1970), DJ and bandleader
 Tuğrul Erat (born 1992), Azerbaijani footballer

References

External links 
  
 Website of Arboretum Sequoiafarm Kaldenkirchen (German)
 Volksbank Krefeld eG

Towns in North Rhine-Westphalia
Viersen (district)